This is a list of content libraries and catalogs owned by Sony.

Sony Pictures Entertainment 
 Sony Pictures Studios library
 Distribution rights to most Morgan Creek Entertainment film library, pre-2011
 Madison Gate Records discography
 Sony Pictures Entertainment Japan Inc.
 AK Holdings library
 Mystery Channel programming library
 MADHOUSE Inc. (5% stake) library (1972–present)
 Sony Pictures Interactive
 Sony Pictures Digital Productions Inc. library (1994–present)
 Sony Pictures Motion Picture Group
 Columbia Pictures library (1924–present) except movies owned by third parties company and films in public domain
 Ghost Corps library (2016–present)
 3000 Pictures library
 Screen Gems library  (1998–present)
 Sony Pictures Animation library (2002–present)
 Screen Gems cartoon library (1921-1949) except the pre-1979 Hanna-Barbera cartoons, owned by Warner Bros. via Turner Entertainment Co., and cartoons in public domain
 Sony Pictures Classics library (1992–present)
 Sony Pictures Home Entertainment
 Sony Wonder library (1992–present)
 Genius Brands (Minority stake) 
 Genius Brands Music discography
 Kartoon Channel programming
 Baby Genius library
 Stan Lee Universe library
 A Squared Entertainment LLC library
 Stan Lee Comics LLC (60%) library
 Wow Unlimited Media library (2016–present)
 Mainframe Studios library (1991–present)
 Frederator Networks 
 Frederator Studios library (1997–present)
 Frederator Films
 Channel Frederator Network programming library (2012–present)
 StashRiot library
 Cartoon Hangover library (2012–present)
 Frederator Flux
 The Leaderboard Network programming library
 Cinematica programming library
 MicDrop programming library
 Atomo Network (Joint venture with Ánima) programming library
 Frederator Books library
 Thirty Labs library
 Ezrin Hirsh Entertainment (EHE) library
 Big Picture Productions library
 Sony Pictures Worldwide Acquisitions Group
 Destination Films library (1998–present)
 Stage 6 Films library (2007–present)
 Affirm Films library (2007–present)
 Affirm Television library
 Triumph Films library 
 Pure Flix library (2005–present)
 TriStar Pictures library (1982–present) except movies from Carolco Pictures, owned by StudioCanal, Candyman, owned by Universal Pictures via PolyGram Filmed Entertainment, and The Running Man, owned by Paramount Pictures
 TriStar Productions library (2013–present)
 Crunchyroll, LLC library (shared ownership with Sony Music Entertainment Japan's Aniplex; 2006–present)
 Crunchyroll UK and Ireland library (1987–present)
 Madman Anime library (1996–present)
 Crunchyroll EMEA library (2007–present)
 Crunchyroll SAS library
 Crunchyroll SA library
 Crunchyroll GmbH library
 Crunchyroll Studios library
 Crunchyroll Games, LLC library 
 Right Stuf library (1987–present)
 Nozomi Entertainment library
 5 Points Pictures library
 RightStufAnime.com library
 Mobile Suit Gundam library (1979–present, in conjunction with Sunrise, Inc.)
 Select Eleven Arts library (1997–present, in conjunction with Eleven Arts, other titles released by Shout! Factory)
 Ponycan USA library (2014–present, in conjunction with Pony Canyon)
 Aniplex of America library (2005–present, in conjunction with Aniplex of America)

Television 
 Sony Pictures Television library (1947–present)
 Sony Pictures Television Studios
 Adelaide Productions library (1993–present)
 CPT Holdings, Inc. library
 Gemstone Studios library
 TriStar Television library (1986–present)
 ELP Communications library
 Embassy Television/Communications library
 T.A.T. Communications library
 Tandem Productions library
 TOY Proudctions library 
 Coca-Cola Telecommunications library
 Colex Enterprises library 
 Spelling-Goldberg Productions library 
 2waytraffic library (2004–present) 
 2waytraffic Mobile library
 2waytraffic International library
 Bad Wolf library (2015–present) except for third party television shows
 Barry-Enright Productions library 
 Blueprint Television  library (2005–present)
 Califon Productions, Inc. library (1975–present)
 Barris Industries library 
 Culver Entertainment library (1987–present)
 Electric Ray library
 Eleventh Hour Films library
 Eleven library (2006–present)
 Embassy Row library (2005–present)
 Fable Pictures library
 Floresta (2010–present) except for third parties TV shows and movies
 Huaso library
 Human Media library
 Jeopardy Productions, Inc. library (1964–present)
 Peanuts Worldwide (39%; with WildBrain (41%) and Charles M. Schulz Creative Associates (20%)) library (1950–present)
 Lean-M library 
 Merv Griffin Productions/Enterprises library
 Left Bank Pictures library (2007–present)
 Palladium Fiction library
 Playmaker Media library
 Satisfy (joint venture with Satisfaction Group; 20%) library
 Silvergate Media library (2011–present) including Chorion library
 Stellify Media library (2014–present)
 Stewart Tele-Enterprises library 
 Stolen Picture library (2016–present)
 Teleset library (2009–present)
 Teleset Mexico (2016–present)
 Toro Media library
 The Whisper Group library
 Aniplex library
 A-1 Pictures library
 Cloverworks library
 Aniplex (Shanghai) Ltd. (51%) library
 Boundary Inc. library
 Peppermint Anime GmbH (joint venture with Peppermint GmbH) library
 Quatro A Inc. library
 Rialto Entertainment Inc. library

Music 
 Sony Music Group
 Sony Music Publishing 
 4 Star Records discography (c1950 – c1980)
 APM Music
 Sonoton discography (1965–present)
 Bruton Music discography
 Cezame Music discography
 Hard and Kosinus discography
 Bleeding Fingers Music discography (2013–present)
 Challenge Records discography (1957 – late 1960)
 EMI Music Publishing discography (1974–present)
 EMI Production Music discography, except musics in public domain
 Extreme Music discography (1997–present)
 Hickory Records discography (1954–present)
 KPM Music
 Remote Control Productions discography (1989–present)
 Sony Music Entertainment Inc.
 Columbia Records discography (1931–present), except musics on public domain
 Startime International discography (2000–present)
 Epic Records discography (1953–present)
 Bad Boy Records discography (1993–present)
 Freebandz discography (2011–present)
 Ariola Records discography (1958–present)
 Deutsche Harmonia Mundi discography (1958–present)
 So So Def Recordings discography (1993–present)
 Volcano Entertainment discography (1996–present)
 Kemosabe Records discography (2011–present)
 Legacy Recordings discography (1990–present)
 Bell Records discography
 BMG Heritage discography
 Colpix Records/Colgems Records discography
 J Records discography
 Windham Hill Records discography
 LaFace Records discography
 Zomba Group of Companies discography
 Battery Records discography
 Jive Records discography
 Jive Electro discography
 Scotti Bros. Records discography
 Zoo Entertainment discography
 Buddah Records discography
 Kama Sutra Records discography
 Philadelphia International Records discography
 Work Group discography
 The Orchard discography (1997–present)
 Blind Pig Records discography (1977–present)
 Frenchkiss Records discography (1999–2004)
 RED Distribution discography (1979–present)
 Shrapnel Records discography (1980–present)
 RCA Records discography (1942–present) 
 RCA Inspiration discography (2005–present)
 Fo Yo Soul discography
 GospoCentric Records discography (1993–present)
 B'Rite Music discography
 Quiet Water Entertainment discography
 Verity Records discography (1994–present)
 Arista Records Discography (1974-present)
 Ultra Music discography (1995–present)
 Sony Masterworks 
 Masterworks Broadway discography (2006–present)
 Milan Records discography (1978–present)
 Okeh Records discography (1916–present), except musics on public domain
 Portrait Records discography (1976–present)
 Sony Classical Records discography (1924–present)
 Sony Music Australia discography (2004–present)
 Sony Music Brasil discography (1961–present)
 Amigo Records discography (1994–present)
 Phonomotor Records discography (1999–present)
 Som Livre discography (1969–present)
 Austro Music
 SLAP
 Soma
 Diretoria Funk
 Inbraza
 Sigem
 Sony Music Canada discography (2009–present)
 Ratas Music Group discography (2009–present)
 Sony Music China discography (2012–present)
 Sony Music France discography (2010–present)
 Sony Music Entertainment Hong Kong discography (2012–present)
 Sony Music Entertainment Poland discography (1995–present)
 Sony Music India discography (1997–present)
 Zee Music Company discography 
 Sony Music Indonesia discography (2012–present)
 Sony Music Latin discography (1980–present)
 Sony Music Mexico discography (1967–present)
 Sony Music Nashville discography 
 Arista Nashville discography (1989–present)
 Columbia Nashville discography 
 RCA Records Nashville discography
 Provident Label Group discography (1997–present)
 Essential Records discography (1992–present)
 Flicker Records discography (2000–present)
 Provident Films discography
 Reunion Records discography (1982–present)
 Beach Street Records discography (2003–present)
 Sony Music Philippines discography (1995–present)
 Sony Music Taiwan discography (1993–present)
 Sony Music Thailand discography (2010–present)
 Bakery Music discography (1994–present)
 Sony BEC-TERO Music discography (2007–present)
 Sony Music UK discography (1980–present)
 Black Butter Records (49%) discography (2010–present)
 Columbia Records UK discography (2006–present)
 Dream Life Records discography
 Insanity Records (joint venture with Insanity Group) discography
 Magic Star discography
 Ministry of Sound discography (1991–present)
 Music for Nations discography (1983–present)
 RCA Label Group UK discography (2006–present)
 Relentless Records discography (1999–present)
 Since '93 discography (1993–present)
 Sony Commercial Group discography
 Sony Music Legacy - UK discography
 Sony Music Nashville UK discography
 Sony Music Entertainment Japan
 Aniplex Music discography
 Ariola Japan discography (2009–present)
 Epic Records Japan discography (1978–present)
 Ki/oon Music discography (1992–present)
 Fitz Beat discography
 Haunted Records discography
 Ki/oon Records2 discography
 NeOSITE discography
 Siren Song discography
 Trefort discography
 M-On Entertainment, Inc. discography (1998–present)
 Music On! TV programming (1998–present)
 Sacra Music discography (2017–present)
 Sony Creative Products Inc. discography
 Sony DADC Japan Inc. discography
 Sony Music Artists Inc. discography
 Sony Music Communications Inc. discography
 Sony Music Direct (Japan) Inc. discography
 Sony Music Labels Inc. discography
 Sony Music Marketing Inc. discography
 Sony Music Associated Records discography
 Sony Music Publishing discography
 Sony Music Records discography (1968–present)
 gr8! Records discography (2003–present)
 Mastersix Foundation discography (2004–present)
 N46Div discography (2011–present)
 Niagara Records discography (1975–present)
 VVV Records discography (2010–2012)

Sony Interactive Entertainment 
 Audiokinetic library (2000–present)
 Bungie game library (1990–present), except Halo games owned by Microsoft, via Xbox Game Studios
 Gaikai library (2008–present)
 PlayStation Productions game library (2019–present)
 PlayStation Studios
 Bluepoint Games game library (2006–present)
 China Hero Project game library
 Unties library (2017–present)
 Dimps (joint venture with Bandai Namco) game library (2000–present)
 Safari Games library 
 Firesprite game library (2012–present)
 Fabrik Games library (2014–present)
 ForwardWorks game library (2016–present)
 Guerrilla Games library (2000–present)
 Housemarque game library (1995–present)
 Insomniac Games library (1994–present), with some exceptions 
 Insomniac North Carolina library
 Media Molecule game library (2008–present)
 Naughty Dog game library (1985–present), with some exceptions 
 ICE Team game library 
 Nixxes Software game library (1998–present), with some exceptions
 PlayStation Talents game library (2022–present)
 Polyphony Digital game library (1994–present)
 SCEE R&D game library 
 Bend Studio game library (1993–present), except for games distributed by Accolade owned by Billionsoft 
 Team Asobi game library (2013–present)
 London Studio game library (2002–present)
 Malaysia Studio game library 
 San Diego Studio game library (2002–present)
 San Mateo Studio game library (1998–present)
 Santa Monica Studio game library (2001–present)
 Sucker Punch Productions game library (2002–present)
 Valkyrie Entertainment game library (2002–present), with some exceptions 
 Visual Arts game library 
 XDev game library (2000–present), with some exceptions
 SN Systems library
 Aniplex game library
 ANIPLEX.EXE library
 Lasengle game library

References 

Sony
Sony